Harry Joseph O'Brien (October 31, 1884 – August 23, 1955), nicknamed "Shorty", was an American football, basketball, and baseball coach. He was the fifth head football coach at The Citadel, serving for five seasons, from 1916 to 1918 and from 1920 to 1921, compiling a record of 14–15–4. 
O'Brien also coached basketball and baseball for The Citadel for two seasons during World War I. He tallied a record of 6–2 in basketball and 3–9 in baseball. O'Brien died of coronary thrombosis on August 23, 1955, at his home in Philadelphia.

Head coaching record

Football

See also
 List of college football head coaches with non-consecutive tenure

References

1884 births
1955 deaths
American football quarterbacks
Basketball coaches from Connecticut
The Citadel Bulldogs football coaches
The Citadel Bulldogs baseball coaches
The Citadel Bulldogs basketball coaches
Deaths from coronary thrombosis 
Drexel Dragons football coaches
Drexel Dragons men's basketball coaches
Gettysburg Bullets football coaches
Gettysburg Bullets men's basketball coaches
Players of American football from New Haven, Connecticut
Sportspeople from New Haven, Connecticut
Swarthmore Garnet Tide football players